Knud Nielsen (born 26 June 1936) is a Danish rower. He competed at the 1960 Summer Olympics and the 1964 Summer Olympics.

References

External links
 

1936 births
Living people
Danish male rowers
Olympic rowers of Denmark
Rowers at the 1960 Summer Olympics
Rowers at the 1964 Summer Olympics
People from Faxe Municipality
Sportspeople from Region Zealand